Beag Fair Siding railway station served the village of Clynderwen, Pembrokeshire, Wales, from 1878 to 1949 on the Narberth Road and Maenclochog Railway.

History 
The station opened in April 1878 by the Narberth Road and Maenclochog Railway. It was situated on the north side of an unnamed road on the C3032. It had no platforms so people had to alight on the road, specifically the road along the siding, which the north, of which points were operated by a six-point ground frame. The station closed on 1 January 1883 but it reopened on 1 April 1895 to goods only. A six-lever signal box was installed around this time to prevent mishaps. This was removed in 1898 by the GWR even though they suggested that it should be built. Not much goods traffic was handled here due to the remote location and it closed on 16 May 1949.

References

External links 

Disused railway stations in Pembrokeshire
Railway stations in Great Britain opened in 1878
Railway stations in Great Britain closed in 1883
1878 establishments in Wales